Justice Arnold may refer to:

Dutee Arnold, associate justice of the Rhode Island Supreme Court
James M. Arnold, associate justice of the Supreme Court of Mississippi
Josiah Arnold (judge), associate justice of the Rhode Island Supreme Court
Morris S. Arnold, special chief justice of the Arkansas Supreme Court 
Peleg Arnold, chief justice of the Rhode Island Supreme Court
Ralph L. Arnold, associate justice of the Montana Supreme Court
Thomas Arnold (Rhode Island), associate justice of the Rhode Island Supreme Court
W. H. "Dub" Arnold, associate justice of the Arkansas Supreme Court

See also
Judge Arnold (disambiguation)